Eucalyptus flavida, commonly known as yellow-flowered mallee, is a species of mallee that is endemic to Western Australia. It has smooth greyish bark, sometimes with rough, flaking brownish bark at the base, lance-shaped adult leaves, long, elongated, tapering flower buds in groups of nine or eleven, yellow flowers and cylindrical or barrel-shaped fruit.

Description
It has smooth, greyish bark, sometimes with rough, flaky brown bark at the base of the trunk. Flowering occurs in November and December and the flowers are yellow.

Taxonomy and naming
Eucalyptus flavida was first formally described by the botanists Ian Brooker and Stephen Hopper in 1991 in the journal Nuytsia from a specimen collected near Broad Arrow by Richard Helms in 1899. The specific epithet (flavida) is from the Latin word meaning "yellowish", referring to the colour of the flowers.

Distribution and habitat
The yellow-flowered mallee is found among granite breakaways in the north and east of Kalgoorlie in the Coolgardie and Murchison biogeographic regions of Western Australia where it grows in red loamy soils with quartz or calcrete.

See also
List of Eucalyptus species

References

flavida
Endemic flora of Western Australia
Mallees (habit)
Myrtales of Australia
Eucalypts of Western Australia
Plants described in 1991
Taxa named by Ian Brooker
Taxa named by Stephen Hopper